Chelsea or Chelsey may refer to:

Places

Australia
 Chelsea, Victoria

Canada
 Chelsea, Nova Scotia
 Chelsea, Quebec

United Kingdom
 Chelsea, London, an area of London, bounded to the south by the River Thames
 Chelsea (UK Parliament constituency), a former parliamentary constituency at Westminster until the 1997 redistribution
 Chelsea (London County Council constituency), 1949–1965
 King's Road Chelsea railway station, a proposed railway station
 Chelsea Bridge, a bridge across the Thames
 Metropolitan Borough of Chelsea, a former borough in London

United States
 Chelsea, Alabama
 Chelsea (Delaware City, Delaware), a historic house
 Chelsea, Georgia
 Chelsea, Indiana
 Chelsea, Iowa, in Tama County
 Chelsea, Maine
 Chelsea, Massachusetts
 Bellingham Square station, which includes a commuter rail stop called Chelsea
 Chelsea station (MBTA), a bus rapid transit station in Chelsea
 Chelsea, Michigan
 Chelsey Brook, a stream in Minnesota
 Chelsea, Jersey City, New Jersey
 Chelsea, Dutchess County, New York
 Chelsea, Manhattan, New York City
 Chelsea, Staten Island, New York City
 Chelsea, Oklahoma
 Chelsea, Pennsylvania, in Delaware County
 Chelsea, South Dakota
 Chelsea, Vermont, a New England town
 Chelsea (CDP), Vermont, the main village in the town
 Chelsea (West Point, Virginia), a historic house
 Chelsea, Wisconsin, a town
 Chelsea (CDP), Wisconsin, community in the northeast corner of the town
 Chelsea Township, Butler County, Kansas
 Chelsea Township, Fillmore County, Nebraska

Arts and entertainment
Chelsea Cinema, former name of the Regal Theatre, Adelaide, South Australia

Film and television
 Chelsea (film), a 2010 film
 Chelsea (TV series), a US TV talk show starring Chelsea Handler
 Made in Chelsea, a British reality television show

Music

Bands
 Chelsea (band), an English punk rock band, formed in London in 1976
 Chelsea (American band), an early-1970s folk-rock band from New York City, and former Kiss drummer Peter Criss' first band

Albums
 Chelsea (American band album), the only album released by the eponymous American band
 Chelsea (British band album), debut album released in 1979

Songs
 "Chelsea" (song), a 2006 song by STEFY
 "(I Don't Want to Go to) Chelsea", a 1978 song by Elvis Costello from This Year's Model
 "Chelsea", a 2009 song by The Summer Set from Love Like This
 "Chelsea", a song by The Featherz from their 2017 album Five-Year-Itch
 "Chelsea", a song by Toto from their album Old Is New

Companies
 Chelsea Food Services, an airline catering company
 Chelsea Piers, a sports and entertainment complex in New York City, United States
 Chelsea porcelain factory, a factory that was in London, England
 Chelsea Sugar Refinery, a factory in Birkenhead, New Zealand
 Hotel Chelsea, a hotel in New York City, United States

Organisations
 Chelsea Building Society, a UK building society
 Chelsea College of Arts, an art and design college in London, England
 Royal Hospital Chelsea, home for former soldiers in London, England

People
 Chelsea (name), a given name and list of people with the name

Sports
 Bechem Chelsea, the former name of Berekum Chelsea F.C., a Ghanaian football club based in Bechem, Ghana.
 Chelsea F.C., a Premier League association football club in London, England
 Chelsea F.C., the former name of Glenfield Rovers, a New Zealand association football club based in North Shore City
 Chelsea Hajduk Soccer Club, the former name of Dandenong City SC, an association football club in Melbourne, Australia
 Chelsea F.C. Women, a women's association football club associated with Chelsea F.C.

Other uses
 Chelsea (magazine), a small literary magazine founded in 1958 in New York City
 Chelsea (drink), a carbonated, low-alcohol beverage
 Chelsea Publishing, an imprint of the American Mathematical Society
 Chelsea Tower, a 250-metre skyscraper in Dubai

See also
 Chelsea College (disambiguation)
 Chelsea Council (disambiguation)
 Chelsea and Fulham (UK Parliament constituency), a constituency at Westminster
 Chelsea Girl (disambiguation)
 Chelsea Heights (disambiguation)
 Chelsea High School (disambiguation)
 Chelsea Hotel (disambiguation)
 Chelsea railway station (disambiguation)
 Chelsea smile (disambiguation)
 Royal Borough of Kensington and Chelsea, a borough in London
 
 
 Chelsy (Japanese band), a Japanese band, who formed in 2011 and disbanded in 2018